Sanzu Temple is a Buddhist temple located on Mount Tianzhu, in Qianshan, Anhui, China. Originally built in 505 in the Northern and Southern dynasties (420–589), the temple has a history of over 1550 years, but it was destroyed and rebuilt many times because of war and natural disasters. The present version was completed in 1944.

History

Liang dynasty
The temple was originally built in 505 by monk Baozhi during the Liang dynasty (502–557). It was initially called "Bodhi Temple". In 536, Emperor Wu of Liang (502–557) named it "Shangu Temple".

Sui dynasty
After Yang Jian ascending the throne, the founder of the Sui dynasty (589–618), Emperor Wen (581–604) immediately abolished the policy of destroying Buddha statues during the Northern Zhou (557–581). Emperor Wendi ordered to rebuild temples and restore Buddha statues and sutras. After completing studies under Dazu Huike, Sengcan, the third Patriarch, settled at the temple in 590, where he taught Chan Buddhism for years.

Tang dynasty
In 745, in the reign of Emperor Xuanzong of Tang (712–756), the local official Li Chang built a stupa for preserving the śarīras of Master Sengcan.

In 758, Emperor Suzong (756–763) renamed it "Sanzu Shangu Ganyuan Chan Temple".

In 772, Emperor Daizong (763–779) honored the Buddhist stupa, "Jueji Stupa".

Since Emperor Wuzong (814–846) was a staunch Taoist and due to socio-economic reasons, he ordered to demolish Buddhist temples, confiscate temple lands and force monks to return to secular life. The massive movement was known as the "Great Anti-Buddhist Persecution" or "Huichang Suppression of Buddhism" in Chinese. Sanzu Temple was badly damaged in this massive movement.

In 847, in the ruling of Emperor Xuanzong (847–860), the temple was restored and refurbished.

Song dynasty
In 1028, in the 6th year of Emperor Renzong of Song (1023–1032), the empress dowager gave a sacred tooth relic to the temple and donated property to establish the Zishou Pagoda.

Yuan dynasty
After Song dynasty, the temple went into decline and was incredibly disappeared during the whole Yuan dynasty (1271–1368).

Ming dynasty
In 1425, during the reign of the Hongxi Emperor of the Ming dynasty (1368–1644), abbot Puju renovated and restored the temple.

During the reign of the Chenghua Emperor (1465–1487), local official Pan Jian appropriated a large sum of money for constructing the temple.

In 1635 in the late Ming dynasty, the temple was gradually fell into ruin due to the civil war between Zhang Xianzhong, the leader of roving bandits, and the Ming imperial army.

Qing dynasty
During the Kangxi and Qianlong periods of the Qing dynasty, abbots Poyin and Zhihai raised funds to restore the temple.

In 1860, the temple was devastated by war between the Taiping Rebellion and the Qing army.

Republic of China
In 1944, a year before the Chinese Civil War, abbot Yuehai supervised the reconstruction of Sanzu Temple.

People's Republic of China
The temple was designated as a National Key Buddhist Temple in Han Chinese Area by the State Council of China in 1983.

Architecture
Now the existing main buildings include Shanmen, Heavenly Kings Hall, Mahavira Hall, Thousand Buddha Hall, Hall of Guru and Jueji Stupa.

Hall of Four Heavenly Kings
Maitreya is enshrined in the Hall of Four Heavenly Kings and at the back of his statue is a statue of Skanda.  Statues of Four Heavenly Kings are enshrined in the left and right side of the hall.

Mahavira Hall
The Mahavira Hall was built by abbot Yuehai in 1944. In the center of the hall enshrines the statue of Sakyamuni with Ānanda and Kāśyapa Buddha on the left and right. At the back of the hall are placed the statues of Guanyin, Sudhana, and Longnü.

Thousand Buddha Hall
The Thousand Buddha Hall enshrining a wood carving statue of Vairocana. In the four interior walls one thousand miniature Buddha statues are inlaid in the alcoves.

Hall of Guru
The Hall of Guru houses statues of Bodhidharma, Dazu Huike, Sengcan, with a bronze statue of Baozhi at the back.

Jueji Stupa
The Jueji Stupa, more commonly known as "Sanzu Stupa", was originally constructed in 745 in the Tang dynasty. It was completely destroyed by the Red Guards in the ten-year Cultural Revolution.

References

External links
 

Buddhist temples in Anqing
Tourist attractions in Anqing
1944 establishments in China
20th-century Buddhist temples
Religious buildings and structures completed in 1944